The 2004 BC Lions finished in first place in the West Division with a 13–5 record. They won the West Final and appeared in the 92nd Grey Cup.

Offseason

CFL Draft

Preseason

Regular season

Season standings

Season schedule

Player stats

Passing

Rushing

Receiving

Awards and records
 Casey Printers (QB), – CFL's Most Outstanding Player Award
 Jason Clermont (SB), – CFL's Most Outstanding Canadian Award
 Casey Printers (QB), – Jeff Nicklin Memorial Trophy

2004 CFL All-Stars
 Casey Printers, Quarterback
 Geroy Simon, Slotback
 Barrin Simpson, Linebacker

Western Division All-Star Selections
 Casey Printers, Quarterback
 Jason Clermont, Slotback
 Geroy Simon, Slotback
 Ryan Thelwell, Wide Receiver
 Angus Reid, Centre
 Brent Johnson, Defensive End
 Barrin Simpson, Linebacker
 Sam Young, Safety

Playoffs

West Final

Grey Cup

Toronto Argonauts (27) – TDs, Damon Allen (2), Robert Baker; FGs Noel Prefontaine (2); cons., Prefontaine (3).

BC Lions (19) – TDs, Jason Clermont, Dave Dickenson; FGs Duncan O'Mahony (2); cons. O'Mahony (1).

First Quarter 
BC—TD Clermont 12-yard pass from Dickenson (O'Mahony convert) 4:07 

Second Quarter 
TOR—FG Prefontaine 27-yard field goal 7:40 
TOR—TD Allen 1-yard run (Prefontaine convert) 12:22  
BC—FG O'Mahony 42-yard field goal 13:13 
TOR—TD Baker 23-yard pass from Allen (Prefontaine convert) 14:37 

Third Quarter 
TOR—TD Allen 1-yard run (Prefontaine convert) 4:45 
BC—FG O'Mahony 36-yard field goal 9:16 

Fourth Quarter 
BC—TD Dickenson 7-yard run (convert failed) 6:06 
TOR—FG Prefontaine 16-yard field goal 12:19

References

BC Lions seasons
BC Lions
2004 in British Columbia